Edwin Percy Hallam (1887–1957) (Known as E.Percy Hallam) was an English cathedral organist, who served in St Edmundsbury Cathedral for twenty years from 1937 to 1957. Before serving at the Cathedral, he was organist of St Mary's Church, Bury St Edmunds for eighteen years from 1909 to 1937. He was affectionately known as 'Porky' despite being quite lean.

Background
Hallam was born on 4 September 1887 in Nottingham. He studied the organ with James Kendrick Pyne at Manchester Cathedral.

He was the founder and conductor of the Bach Choir of Bury St. Edmunds.

Career
Organist of:
St. Chad's Church, Withington, Manchester 1907–1909
St. Mary's Church, Bury St. Edmunds 1909–1937
St Edmundsbury Cathedral 1937–1957

Works 

 Magnificat and Nunc Dimittis in A-flat
 Thou wilt keep him in perfect peace
 Lord's Prayer

References

English classical organists
British male organists
Cathedral organists
1887 births
People from Nottingham
1957 deaths
20th-century organists
20th-century British male musicians
20th-century classical musicians
Male classical organists